The College of Justice includes the Supreme Courts of Scotland, and its associated bodies.

The constituent bodies of the national supreme courts are the Court of Session, the High Court of Justiciary, the Office of the Accountant of Court, and the Auditor of the Court of Session. Its associated bodies are the Faculty of Advocates, the Society of Writers to Her Majesty's Signet and the Society of Solicitors in the Supreme Courts of Scotland.

The College is headed by the Lord President of the Court of Session, who also holds the title of Lord Justice General in relation to the High Court of Justiciary, and judges of the Court of Session and High Court are titled Senators of the College of Justice.

History
The College was founded in 1532 by King James V following a bull issued by Pope Clement VII on 15 September 1531. It provided for 10,000 gold ducats to be contributed by the Scottish bishoprics and monastic institutions for the maintenance of its members, one half of whom would be members of the "ecclesiastical dignity".

The Parliament of Scotland passed an Act on 17 May 1532 authorising the creation of the college with 14 members, half spiritual, half temporal, plus a president and the Lord Chancellor. The college convened for the first time on 27 May 1532, in the royal presence.

Supplementing the 14 ordinary lords, who were called Senators, were an indefinite number of supernumerary judges called extraordinary lords.

The founding members of the College of Justice were:
 The Lord Chancellor, Gavin Dunbar, Archbishop of Glasgow
 The Lord President, Alexander Myln, Abbot of Cambuskenneth
 Richard Bothwell, Rector of Ashkirk
 John Dingwell, Provost of Trinity College
 Henry White, Rector of Finevin
 William Gibson, Dean of Restalrig
 Thomas Hay, Dean of Dunbar
 Robert Reid, Abbot of Kinloss
 George Ker, Provost of Dunglass
 Sir William Scott of Balweary
 Henry Lauder, Lord St Germains, King's Advocate
 John Campbell of Lundy
 Sir James Colville of Easter Wemyss
 Sir Adam Otterburn of Auldhame and Redhall, King's Advocate
 Nicholas Crawford of Oxengangs
 Francis Bothwell of Edinburgh (brother of Richard)
 James Lawson of Edinburgh
 Sir James Foulis of Colinton, who was added at the first meeting of the court when the king made him a "Lord of the Session".

The College at its foundation dealt with underdeveloped civil law. It did not dispense justice in criminal matters as that was an area of the law reserved to the King's justice, through the justiciars (hence the High Court of the Justiciary), the Barony Courts and the Commission of Justiciary. The High Court of Justiciary was only incorporated into the College of Justice in 1672.

Initially, there was little legal literature. Acts of the Parliament of Scotland and the books of the Old Law as well as Roman Law and Canon law texts were about all to which the pursuer and defender could refer.

The Treaty of Union 1707 with England preserved the Scottish Legal System. Article XIX provided "that the Court of Session or College of Justice do after the Union and notwithstanding thereof remain in all time coming within Scotland, and that the Court of Justiciary do also after the Union ... remain in all time coming."

See also

Senator of the College of Justice
Historic List of Senators of the College of Justice
Extraordinary Lord of Session
Principal Clerk of Session and Justiciary

References

External links
Supreme Courts at the National Archives of Scotland

 
Courts of Scotland
Scotland
Organisations based in Edinburgh
16th-century papal bulls
1532 establishments in Scotland
1532 in law
Organizations established in the 1530s